Tauscha is a former municipality in the district of Meißen, in Saxony, Germany. Since 1 January 2016 it is part of the municipality Thiendorf.

Municipality subdivisions
Tauscha includes the following subdivisions:
Dobra
Kleinnaundorf
Würschnitz
Zschorna

References 

Meissen (district)
Former municipalities in Saxony